36th Artios Awards, presented by the Casting Society of America, honoring the best originality, creativity and the contribution of casting to the overall quality of a film, television, theatre and short-form projects, was held on April 15, 2021, virtually.

The television, theater, short film and short-form nominations were announced on January 8, 2021. The film nominations were announced on February 19, 2021.

Winners and nominees
Winners are listed first and highlighted in boldface:

Film

Television

Short-Form Projects

Theatre

Rosalie Joseph Humanitarian Award
The Actors Fund

Hoyt Bowers Award
Robi Reed
Tara Rubin

Associate Spotlight Award
Gianna Butler
Michael Rios

References

A
A
A
April 2021 events in the United States
Artios Awards